Mammalia is a peer-reviewed scientific journal of biology focusing on mammals. It is published by the De Gruyter and is edited by Christiane Denys (Muséum National d'Histoire Naturelle).

Abtrascting and indexing
The journal is abstracted and indexed in the following bibliographic databases:

According to the Journal Citation Reports, the journal has a 2017 impact factor of 0.714.

References

External links

Publications established in 1937
English-language journals
Biology journals
De Gruyter academic journals
Bimonthly journals